Miss Aruba is a national beauty pageant in Aruba. The pageant was founded in 1964, where the winners were sent to Miss Universe.

History
Under the direction of New Star Promotion Organization since 1992, Aruba has been accumulating positive results, with Taryn Mansell placing as first runner-up in 1996 at Miss Universe and Tamara Scaroni, becoming the first Aruban to receive the Miss Congeniality award in 2000; representatives placing as semifinalists in 1990, 1996, 2002, along with a first runner-up in 2001 at Miss World; and another semifinalist in Miss International 2001, three Best National Costume awards in 2000, 2007, 2008 and a first runner-up placement in 1994 at Miss International. In 2011, the New Star Promotion acquired the franchise for Miss Earth.

Titleholders 
The following is a list of winners from 1963 to Present. The pageant has not been held in 1986-1988.

Titleholders under Miss Aruba Foundation

Miss Aruba Universe

The Miss Aruba winner usually represents the island at Miss Universe. In 2012 the Aruban representative selected in separate casting "Miss Universe Aruba", and began 2013 the main Miss Aruba titleholder is recompeting at Miss Universe pageant. On occasion, when the winner does not qualify (due to age) for either contest, a runner-up is sent.

Miss Aruba World

The second placed of Miss Aruba will crown Miss Aruba World and will represent the island at Miss World. In some years the main Miss Aruba could compete at Miss World. On occasion, when the position does not qualify (due to age) for either contest, another contestant is sent.

Past titleholders under Miss Aruba Foundation

Miss Aruba International

The third placed of Miss Aruba was titling Miss Aruba International and went to Miss International until 2011. Began 2012 Aruban representative at Miss International beauty pageant will select at Señorita Aruba contest.

See also
Miss Aruba 2018
Aruba at major beauty pageants

References

External links 
 Facebook page

Beauty pageants in Aruba
Recurring events established in 1964
1964 establishments in Aruba
Dutch awards
Aruba